Robert George Young (February 22, 1907 – July 21, 1998) was an American film, television and radio actor best known for his leading roles as Jim Anderson, the father character, in Father Knows Best (CBS, then NBC, then CBS again) and the physician Marcus Welby in Marcus Welby, M.D. (ABC).

Early life
Born in Chicago, Young was the son of an Irish immigrant father, Thomas E. Young, and an American mother, Margaret Fyfe. While Young was a child, the family moved to various locations within the U.S., including Seattle as well as Los Angeles, where Young was a student at Abraham Lincoln High School. After graduation, he studied and performed at the Pasadena Playhouse while working odd jobs and appearing in bit parts in silent films. While touring with a stock company producing "The Ship", Young was discovered by a Metro-Goldwyn-Mayer talent scout who signed the fledgling actor to a contract. Young made his sound-film debut for Fox Film Corporation in the 1931 Charlie Chan film Black Camel, starring Warner Oland.

Film career
Young appeared in over 100 films between 1928 and 1952. In spite of having a "tier B" status, he co-starred with some of the studio's most illustrious actresses, such as Katharine Hepburn, Margaret Sullavan, Norma Shearer, Joan Crawford, Helen Hayes, Luise Rainer, Hedy Lamarr, Helen Twelvetrees and (unrelated) Loretta Young. Yet most of his assignments consisted of short B movies, also known as "programmers", which required brief two- to three-week shooting schedules. Actors who were relegated to such hectic routines appeared, as Young did, in some six to eight movies per year.

As an MGM contract player, Young was obligated to accept any film assigned to him or risk being placed on suspension—and many actors who were placed on suspension were prohibited from earning a salary from any endeavor at all, even those unrelated to the film industry. In 1936, MGM summarily loaned Young to Gaumont British in the U.K. for two films; the first, Secret Agent, was directed by Alfred Hitchcock, while the other, It's Love Again, co-starred Jessie Matthews. While in England, he was convinced that MGM intended to terminate his contract, but he was mistaken.

He unexpectedly received one of his most rewarding roles late in his MGM career, in H.M. Pulham, Esq. (1941), which also benefited from one of Hedy Lamarr's most effective performances. He once remarked that he was assigned only those roles which Robert Montgomery and other A-list actors had rejected.

After his contract expired with MGM, Young starred in light comedies and dramas for studios such as 20th Century Fox, United Artists, and RKO Radio Pictures. From 1943, Young had more challenging roles in films like Claudia, The Enchanted Cottage, They Won't Believe Me, The Second Woman, and Crossfire. His portrayals of unsympathetic characters in several of these later films—which had seldom been the case in his MGM pictures—were applauded by numerous critics. In 1949, he returned to MGM briefly to appear in That Forsyte Woman with Errol Flynn and Greer Garson. He played the second lead in Secret of the Incas (1954) starring Charlton Heston, the film upon which Raiders of the Lost Ark was subsequently loosely based. Despite the picture's superior quality while being shot on location at Machu Picchu, it was the last feature film in which he appeared. Young's career had begun an incremental and almost imperceptible decline, despite a propitious beginning as a freelance actor without the nurturing of a major studio. He had continued starring as a leading man in the late 1940s and early 1950s, but only in mediocre films, and occasionally playing supporting roles in important films. Then, he subsequently disappeared from the silver screen—only to reappear, successfully, several years later on a much smaller one.

Television career
Today, Young is most remembered as the affable insurance salesman in the long-running popular sitcom Father Knows Best (1949–1954 on radio, 1954–1960 on television), for which he and his co-star Jane Wyatt won several Emmy Awards. Elinor Donahue ("Betty"), Billy Gray ("Bud"), and Lauren Chapin ("Kathy") played the Anderson children in the television version.

Young then created, produced, and starred with Ford Rainey and Constance Moore in the nostalgic CBS comedy series Window on Main Street (1961–1962).

Young's final television series was Marcus Welby, M.D. (1969–1976), co-starring a young James Brolin. This show earned an Emmy for Young, for best leading actor in a drama series.

He shared the stage on The Dick Cavett Show with Jimi Hendrix in September 1969.

Until 1982, he made numerous television commercials for Sanka coffee.

The popular phrase "I'm not a doctor, but I play one on TV" from a commercial for Vicks 44 cough medicine has been erroneously attributed to Young due to his Marcus Welby, MD fame.  It was actually spoken by actor Chris Robinson and then by Peter Bergman during the 1980s.

Personal life and death
Young was married to Betty Henderson for 61 years from 1933 until her death in 1994. They had four daughters: Carol Proffitt, Barbara Beebe, Kathy Young, and Betty Lou Gleason. They also had six grandchildren and nine great-grandchildren.

Despite his trademark portrayal of happy, well-adjusted characters, Young's bitterness toward Hollywood casting practices never diminished, and he suffered from depression and alcoholism, culminating in a suicide attempt in January 1991. Later, he spoke candidly about his personal problems in an effort to encourage others to seek help. The Robert Young Community Mental Health Center is named after Young in honor of his work toward passage of the 708 Illinois Tax Referendum, which established a property tax to support mental health programs in his home state. The center started in Rock Island, Illinois, and now has sites in both Iowa and Illinois, as part of the Quad-City metropolitan area.

Young died of respiratory failure at his Westlake Village, California, home on July 21, 1998.

He has three stars on the Hollywood Walk of Fame; the stars are in the categories of film (located at 6933 Hollywood Blvd.), television (6358 Hollywood Blvd.), and radio (1660 Vine Street).

Filmography

Awards and nominations

References

Other sources

External links 

 
 
 Robert Young at The New York Times
 
 Literature on Robert Young

1907 births
1998 deaths
Male actors from Chicago
American male film actors
American male radio actors
American male stage actors
American male television actors
American people of Irish descent
Best Drama Actor Golden Globe (television) winners
California Republicans
Deaths from respiratory failure
Outstanding Performance by a Lead Actor in a Drama Series Primetime Emmy Award winners
Illinois Republicans
Male actors from Los Angeles
Metro-Goldwyn-Mayer contract players
20th-century American male actors
People from Westlake Village, California